The Muslim Students Association of South Africa is a representative collective of the various Muslim Students Association (MSA) chapters which can be found in the different tertiary institutions throughout South Africa.

History 
The once strong Muslim Students Association of South Africa (est. 1974), which had branches on many tertiary campuses, became less vocal and thus lost its grip on student activities; the MSA was thus replaced by Islamic societies that were either independent or affiliates of other Muslim organizations outside these institutions. The Muslim Students Association of South Africa has recently been very active once again. The first National Muslim Students Association of South Africa Conference (first in the last 10 years) was held in Durban in January 2004. MSA representatives from all over the country met here. This was hoped to be a new future of student work in the country.

MSA Chapters in South Africa 
The following MSA chapters are found in South Africa
TUKS MSA - University of Pretoria
UCT MSA - University of Cape Town
UKZN MSA - University of KwaZulu Natal
UJ MSA - University of Johannesburg
UWC MSA - University of the Western Cape
US - University of Stellenbosch
MSA RHODES - [Rhodes University - Grahamstown]
PUKKE MSA - North West University - Potchefstroom Campus
CPUT MSA - (Cape Peninsula University of Technology - (Bellville Campus)

MSA National Camp 
An annual camp is usually held in KwaZulu Natal where all members of MSA's across the country are invited to participate in discussion around issues affecting MSA's in general, as well covering aspects of Muslim Leadership in the South African context.

The Message Magazine 
The Message Magazine is currently (2009) a national student magazine, produced and published by MSA members from many different universities. It began (2001) as a monthly newsletter by the MSA at the University of Natal - Durban and was edited and produced by Bilal Randeree and Mariam Jhaveri. By 2003, the newsletter had become a full colour glossy magazine, still produced out of Durban, but with contributors and distribution nationally.

External links
 University of Cape Town Muslim Students Association (UCT MSA)
 University of Pretoria Muslim Students Association (TUKS MSA)

Student organisations in South Africa
Islamic organisations based in South Africa